The Faculty of Electrical Engineering or ETF is one of the faculties of University of Sarajevo. The faculty was formed in 1961. The Building of the Faculty of Electrical Engineering is on the campus of the University of Sarajevo.

The Faculty is divided into four departments:
 Computing and Informatics (RI)
 Electrical Power Engineering (EE)
 Telecommunication (TK)
 Automatic Control and Electronics (AE)

For certain specialized laboratories, the Faculty uses facilities in public companies Elektroprivreda BiH and BH Telecom.

External links

University of Sarajevo
Electrical engineering departments